The Offensive Guard  is a project of Ukrainian Ministry of Internal Affairs with the aim to form new assault brigades in the structure of National Guard, National Police and Border Guards. The project commenced in January 2023.

History 
The formation envisions a strength of eight exclusively volunteer assault brigades, to be active by April 2023. It was initially created by the inclusion of the Azov Brigade (formerly Azov Regiment), and a call for volunteers, especially from active members of the National Police, Border Guards, and National Guard and veterans of the Russo-Ukrainian War that started when Russia invaded Ukraine in February 2014.

In just over a week, Internal Affairs registered 27,000 enquiries including 15,000 applications for admission, 500 of them female candidates, while more than 800 had already passed medical examinations in the enlistment process.

Structure 
As of 2023, the structure is as follows:

State Border Guard 
 Stalevyi Kordon Brigade
 Brigade HQ and HQ Company

National Guard 
 Azov Assault Brigade, Yurivka, Donetsk Oblast
 Brigade HQ and HQ Company
 1st Company
 2nd Company
 3rd Company
 4th Company
 Tank Company
 1st (Presidential) Bureviy Brigade Petro Doroshenko, Vyshhorod, Kyiv Oblast
 Brigade HQ and HQ Company
 1st Infantry Battalion
 2nd Infantry Battalion
 3rd Infantry Battalion
 Artillery Battalion
 Anti-Aircraft Defense Battalion
 14th Chervona Kalyna Brigade Ivan Bohun, Kalynivka, Vinnytsia Oblast
 Brigade HQ and HQ Company
 1st Infantry Battalion
 2nd Infantry Battalion
 3rd Infantry Battalion
 12th Kara-Dag Brigade, Zaporizhzhia, Zaporizhzhia Oblast
 Brigade HQ and HQ Company
 1st Infantry Battalion
 2nd Infantry Battalion
 3rd Infantry Battalion
 Tank Company
 Artillery Battalion
 Anti-Aircraft Defense Battalion
 Reconnaissance Company
 4th Rubizh Brigade, Hostomel, Kyiv Oblast
 Brigade HQ and HQ Company
 1st Guardsmen Battalion
 2nd Guardsmen Battalion
 Svoboda Battalion
 Tank Company
 Artillery Battalion
 Anti-Aircraft Defense Battalion
3rd Spartan Brigade, Kharkiv, Kharkiv Oblast
 Brigade HQ and HQ Company
 1st Infantry Battalion
 2nd Infantry Battalion
 3rd Infantry Battalion
 4th Infantry Battalion
 Tank Company
 Artillery Battalion
 Anti-Aircraft Defense Battalion
 Reconnaissance Company

National Police 

 Liut Brigade, Kyiv
 Brigade HQ and HQ Company
 Tsunami Assault Regiment
 Safari Assault Regiment
 Luhansk-1 Special Purpose Battalion

References 
External links

 Offensive Guard, official website

2023 establishments in Ukraine
Military units and formations established in 2023
Paramilitary forces of Ukraine
Volunteer National Guard units of Ukraine
Military units and formations of the Russo-Ukrainian War